Denys Slyusar (born 27 May 2002) is a Ukrainian professional footballer who plays as a defender for Rukh Lviv.

Career
Born in Uzhhorod, where his father played for the local Zakarpattia Uzhhorod, Slyusar is a product of the local youth sportive school and the UFK-Karpaty Lviv youth sportive school system.

He played for FC Karpaty in the Ukrainian Premier League Reserves and was ultimately promoted to the senior squad. When Karpaty was relegated into the Ukrainian Second League he continued to play there for a short time before signing with Ukrainian Premier League club FC Rukh Lviv in October 2020. He made his debut for FC Rukh as a starter against MFC Mykolaiv on 21 September 2021 in the Round of 32 of the 2021–22 Ukrainian Cup.

Personal life
He is a son of Ukrainian retired international football player Valentyn Slyusar.

References

External links
Profile at UAF Official Site (Ukr)

2002 births
Living people
Sportspeople from Uzhhorod
Ukrainian footballers
FC Karpaty Lviv players
FC Rukh Lviv players
Ukrainian Premier League players
Ukrainian Second League players
Ukraine youth international footballers
Ukraine under-21 international footballers
Association football defenders